The Jumpin' Blues is an album by saxophonist Dexter Gordon which was recorded in 1970 and released on the Prestige label.

Reception

Scott Yanow of Allmusic states, "Although tenor saxophonist Dexter Gordon seemed to have been largely forgotten in the U.S. during his long residence in Europe, he was playing in prime form during the period and made occasional trips back to America".

Track listing 
All compositions by Dexter Gordon except as indicated
 "Evergreenish" - 6:02  
 "For Sentimental Reasons" (William Best, Deek Watson) - 6:49
 "Star Eyes" (Gene de Paul, Don Raye) - 5:21     
 "Rhythm-a-Ning" (Thelonious Monk) - 6:51     
 "If You Could See Me Now" (Tadd Dameron, Carl Sigman) - 6:34     
 "The Jumpin' Blues" (Jay McShann, Charlie Parker) - 5:46

Personnel 
Dexter Gordon - tenor saxophone
Wynton Kelly - piano
Sam Jones - bass
Roy Brooks - drums

References 

Dexter Gordon albums
1970 albums
Prestige Records albums
Albums produced by Don Schlitten